The Aldershot by-election  was held on 28 October 1954 when the Incumbent Conservative MP, Oliver Lyttelton was elevated to a new hereditary peerage, as Viscount Chandos.  The by-election was won by the Conservative candidate Eric Errington.

References

Aldershot by-election
Aldershot, 1954
By-election, 1954
Aldershot by-election
20th century in Hampshire
Aldershot by-election